The Big Clifty Formation is a geologic formation in Indiana. It preserves fossils dating back to the Carboniferous period.

In Illinois and Kentucky, the Big Clifty is referred to as the Big Clifty Sandstone and has been assigned to the Golconda Formation.

See also
 List of fossiliferous stratigraphic units in Indiana

References

Carboniferous Indiana
Carboniferous southern paleotropical deposits